Batcombe is a village and civil parish in the Mendip district of Somerset, England, situated in the steep valley of the River Alham  south-east of Shepton Mallet and  south of Bristol.  The parish has a population of 439. Batcombe village is at the heart of the parish, which also includes the hamlets of Westcombe, Spargrove and Eastcombe (historically Ashcombe).

History

The name Batcombe comes from Saxon and means "Bat's Valley".

Around  from Batcombe village is an Iron Age hill fort on Smalldown Knoll which dates back to the Iron Age and possibly the Bronze Age.

Batcombe is thought to have been established around 660 CE following the Saxon invasion of Great Britain.  Both settlements are recorded in the Domesday Book written after the Norman invasion of England in 1066. The parish of Batcombe was part of the Whitstone Hundred.

The Mendip district was, for several centuries, highly dependent on the wool industry, with which these villages were linked.

Westcombe was for many years property of Glastonbury Abbey which was destroyed with the Dissolution of the Monasteries. The hamlet and area as a whole had strong links with the English woolen industry, which gave name to settlements such as Milton Clevedon.

For a long time the Bisse family owned much property in Batcombe, as well as other local villages, including Spargrove.

The Church of St Mary the Virgin dates from the 15th and 16th centuries and was restored in the 19th. The tower contains five bells dating from 1760 and made by Thomas Bilbie, of the Bilbie family, in Cullompton. It has been designated by English Heritage as a Grade I listed building.

In the 1643 the people of Batcombe got into a fight with the people of Bruton. 

Batcombe has a war memorial dedicated to those who gave their lives in World War I. The war memorial in Westcombe has engraved on it around 12 names. It was originally a family memorial to Henry Ernst in 1913, but it was later converted to a war memorial in 1919.

In 1933 Batcombe village hall was built next to the village school. The hall was constructed largely of timber and built by local villagers. By the 1990s the hall's age was beginning to show, and it was clearly rotting. In 2001 the hall was demolished, mainly by local people. Once the site had been cleared (most of the wood being recycled) the foundations were laid for the new hall. The "Batcombe Jubilee Hall" was completed in May 2002, and officially opened by HRH Prince Charles on 25 May 2002. The Jubilee Hall is mainly of stone construction, with two sides made of external timber. In all the project cost over £500,000. The hall is run by the Batcombe Village Hall Trust, a charitable organisation of volunteers.

The property in Westcombe was historically owned by a single family, the Ernst family who lived in the Georgian country house of Westcombe House. Most of the estate was sold in 1927, and divided between two daughters. One inherited Westcombe House and the other all the family's wealth. The house fell into disrepair, and was demolished in the early 1950s. Today the hamlet is home to a small industrial site owned mainly by Milton-Westcombe Farms Limited. The largest business operation on site is that of the Bay Tree Food Company, which produces handmade pickled and jam goods sold across the UK.

Governance

The parish council has responsibility for local issues, including setting an annual precept (local rate) to cover the council's operating costs and producing annual accounts for public scrutiny. The parish council evaluates local planning applications and works with the local police, district council officers, and neighbourhood watch groups on matters of crime, security, and traffic. The parish council's role also includes initiating projects for the maintenance and repair of parish facilities, as well as consulting with the district council on the maintenance, repair, and improvement of highways, drainage, footpaths, public transport, and street cleaning. Conservation matters (including trees and listed buildings) and environmental issues are also the responsibility of the council.

The village falls within the non-metropolitan district of Mendip, which was formed on 1 April 1974 under the Local Government Act 1972, having previously been part of Shepton Mallet Rural District, which is responsible for local planning and building control, local roads, council housing, environmental health, markets and fairs, refuse collection and recycling, cemeteries and crematoria, leisure services, parks, and tourism.

Somerset County Council is responsible for running the largest and most expensive local services such as education, social services, libraries, main roads, public transport, policing and fire services, Trading Standards, waste disposal and strategic planning.

It is also part of the Wells county constituency represented in the House of Commons of the Parliament of the United Kingdom. It elects one Member of Parliament (MP) by the first past the post system of election.

Before Brexit it was part of the South West England constituency of the European Parliament which elected seven MEPs using the d'Hondt method of party-list proportional representation.

Notable people
Henry Albin (1624–1696) – minister. 
Richard Alleine (1610–1681) – Puritan minister.
Richard Bernard (1568–1641) – Puritan minister.
Philip Bisse (1540–1613) – Puritan Minister, Archdeacon of Taunton, gave nearly 3000 books to found the library at Wadham College, Oxford.

References

External links

Batcombe Village Hall website

Villages in Mendip District
Civil parishes in Somerset